Turgai (from , meaning sparrow) may refer to:
 Turgay Oblast (Russian Empire), an administrative unit of the Russian Empire
 Torgay Region, a former administrative unit in Kazakhstan
 Turgay (river), a river-valley system in Kazakhstan
 Turgai Sea or Turgai Strait, a body of salt water of the Mesozoic and Cenozoic Eras